Rully is a commune in the Saône-et-Loire department in the region of Bourgogne-Franche-Comté in eastern France.

It is known for its red and white Rully wines made from Pinot noir and Chardonnay respectively. The AOC legal area encompasses the village of Chagny as well as Rully itself, contains over twenty Premier Cru designated sub-areas, and borders the Cote Chalonnaise appellations of Bouzeron to the west and Mercurey to the south.

See also
Communes of the Saône-et-Loire department
Rully wine

References

Communes of Saône-et-Loire